Rupert Francis John Carington, 7th Baron Carrington,  (born 2 December 1948), is a British banker, hereditary peer and crossbench member of the House of Lords.

Lord Carrington serves as Lord Great Chamberlain of England since the accession of Charles III in September 2022.

Early life
Carrington is the third child and only son of Peter Carington, 6th Baron Carrington (1919–2018), and his wife Iona née McClean (1920–2009). His father was at the time of his birth in the beginning of his political career and would later hold several prominent positions, including those of Defence Secretary and Foreign Secretary in the first Thatcher ministry, and Secretary General of NATO.

Educated at Eton College, Carrington went up to Bristol University where he graduated with a Bachelor of Science degree. 

Carrington has two sisters, Alexandra (born 1943), married to Captain Peter de Bunsen, and Virginia (born 1946), married to Henry Cubitt, 4th Baron Ashcombe (divorced). 

His maternal grandfather was civil engineer and aviator Sir Francis McClean. His patrilineal ancestor Thomas Smith was the founder of Smith's Bank.

Career
Carrington worked at the merchant bank Morgan, Grenfell & Co. for seventeen years before starting his own financial advisory business, Rupert Carington Limited, in 1987. He currently serves as Chairman of Vietnam Infrastructure Ltd. and of Schroder AsiaPacific Fund, and as an international adviser to the LGT Group.

He succeeded his father as Baron Carrington in July 2018, and became a member of the House of Lords in November of that year, after winning a crossbench hereditary peers' by-election, following the retirement of Lord Northbourne.

On the accession of Charles III in 2022, Carrington became Lord Great Chamberlain of England, according to the hereditary rotation of the office between three noble families.

Personal life
Carrington married Daniela Diotallevi (born 1959) on 12 September 1989; they have three children:

 Hon. Robert Carington (born 7 December 1990, heir apparent)
 Hon. Francesca Aurora Carington (born 24 July 1993)
 Hon. Isabella Iona Carington (born 19 May 1995)

Honours
Lord Carrington was appointed a Deputy Lieutenant for Buckinghamshire in November 1999.

See also
 Lord Great Chamberlain
 Great Officers of State

References

1948 births
Living people
People educated at Eton College
Alumni of the University of Bristol
People from Buckinghamshire
British bankers
Rupert 7
Crossbench hereditary peers
Deputy Lieutenants of Buckinghamshire
Eldest sons of British hereditary barons
Rupert
Sons of life peers
Lord Great Chamberlains
Hereditary peers elected under the House of Lords Act 1999